Rafał Wnuk (born 22 May 1967, in Zamość) is a Polish historian, editor of several historical periodicals, employee of the Institute of History of the Polish Academy of Sciences and of the Polish Institute of National Remembrance (IPN). Wnuk was a student of the Polish historian Tomasz Strzembosz.

Works 
Wnuk specializes in Polish-Ukrainian relations during World War II as well as in the history of Polish resistance (primarily of Armia Krajowa) in the former eastern Polish regions (Kresy), as well as the history of totalitarian systems. Joanna Michlic commends him as one of the most eminent historians studying the Polish anti-Communist underground.

He was the author of one of the most important books on the Polish underground in the Lublin region in 2000. Together with Sławomir Poleszak, Agnieszka Jaczyńska and Magdalena Śladecka he is the editor of "The Atlas of the Polish Independent Underground 1944-1956" (Atlas Polskiego Podziemia Niepodległościowego 1944 – 1956) published in 2007 by the IPN. Wnuk works at the Museum of World War II in Gdańsk and the Catholic University of Lublin.

Views 
Wnuk has been critical of the works on cursed soldiers published by conservative historians, especially under the PiS ministry.

Books
Konspiracja akowska i poakowska na Zamojszczyźnie od lipca 1944 r. do 1956 r., Lublin 1993;
Pany i Rezuny. Współpraca AK-WiN i UPA 1945–1947, Warszawa 1997 (with Grzegorz Motyka);
Okręg Lublin AK-DSZ-WiN 1944–1947, Warszawa 2000.
Atlas polskiego podziemia niepodległościowego 1944–1956 (ed.)
Za pierwszego Sowieta. Polska konspiracja na Kresach Wschodnich II Rzeczypospolitej (wrzesień 1939 – czerwiec 1941), Warszawa 2007. Instytut Pamięci Narodowej i Instytut Studiów Politycznych PAN, .
Wojna po wojnie. Antysowieckie podziemie w Europie Środkowo-Wschodniej w latach 1944-1953, Wydawnictwo Naukowe Scholar – Instytut Studiów Politycznych PAN – Muzeum II Wojny Światowej, Gdańsk – Warszawa 2012. (co-author)

References

1967 births
Living people
People from Zamość
20th-century Polish historians
Polish male non-fiction writers
Recipients of the Silver Cross of Merit (Poland)
People associated with the Institute of National Remembrance
John Paul II Catholic University of Lublin alumni
Academic staff of the John Paul II Catholic University of Lublin
Academic staff of the Polish Academy of Sciences
21st-century Polish historians